"I'm Not Gonna Miss You" is a song recorded by American country music artist Glen Campbell and The Wrecking Crew. Co-written by Campbell and producer Julian Raymond, the song was released on September 30, 2014 for the soundtrack to the documentary Glen Campbell: I'll Be Me, which focuses on the singer's diagnosis of Alzheimer's disease and his final tour.

"I'm Not Gonna Miss You" is the last song to be recorded by Campbell. The song was nominated for Best Original Song at the 87th Academy Awards. During the ceremony, the song was performed by Tim McGraw. It also won the Grammy Award for Best Country Song.

Background 
"I'm Not Gonna Miss You" was initiated by Julian Raymond who pitched an idea of recording the song to James Keach, director of Glen Campbell: I'll Be Me, who eventually decided to use the footage of the recording session as one of the final scenes in the documentary. Raymond discussed the inspiration behind the song:

The song was recorded over four takes within one day. The song also features the members of The Wrecking Crew, the musicians that Campbell has collaborated with before. It was recorded in January 2013 in Los Angeles, and is part of the soundtrack for Glen Campbell: I'll Be Me which premiered on October 24, 2014.

Accolades

Elton John version
In October 2021, Elton John released his collaborative album The Lockdown Sessions. "I'm Not Gonna Miss You" is the final track of the album and is a virtual duet with Glen Campbell.

References 

Glen Campbell songs
2014 songs
Songs written by Glen Campbell